Emerson Coatsworth, Jr., KC (March 9, 1854 – May 11, 1943) was a Canadian lawyer and politician. He was also a member of the Orange Order in Canada.

Born in Toronto, Coatsworth was educated at the public schools, and studied privately for matriculation into the Law Society. Afterwards he attended Osgoode Hall Law School, and graduated in law in University of Toronto in 1886. A practicing lawyer, he was elected to the House of Commons of Canada for the riding of Toronto East in the 1891 federal election. A Conservative, he was defeated in the 1896 election by Independent Conservative John Ross Robertson. In 1904, he was elected an alderman for the Toronto City Council. From 1906 to 1907, he was the 33rd Mayor of Toronto.

References
 The Canadian album : men of Canada; or, Success by example, in religion, patriotism, business, law, medicine, education and agriculture; containing portraits of some of Canada's chief business men, statesmen, farmers, men of the learned professions, and others; also, an authentic sketch of their lives; object lessons for the present generation and examples to posterity (Volume 1) (1891–1896) page 18

External links
 

1854 births
1943 deaths
Conservative Party of Canada (1867–1942) MPs
Mayors of Toronto
Members of the House of Commons of Canada from Ontario
University of Toronto alumni
Canadian King's Counsel